The Finnish Correspondence Chess Federation (FCCF) is a member of the International Correspondence Chess Federation (ICCF) in Europe.

History

Overview
The first known correspondence chess game in Finland started on 1 March 1889. Helsinki Chess Club organised a match between Messers Backmansson and Öhquist. The opening was English opening and it ended already in 11 moves into a win of Öhquist.

The first team-game played by cards started on 16 October 1890 between Helsinki Chess-Club and Tarto in Estonia.

Correspondence chess, as it is known today, started on 2 December 1928 when Der Internationaler Fernschachbund (IFSB), the predecessor of ICCF, was founded in Berlin. The first Finnish person in the organization of IFSB's was A. Hinds, who was elected as an adjudicator in 1935.

The first Finnish participant in the championship tournaments of IFSB was Fritz R. Soininen in 1937. The story of IFSB's organization as a representative of all correspondence chess players was ended by the Second World War in 1939. After the war the International Correspondence Chess Association (ICCA) was founded and B. H. Wood from Britain was chosen as the president. The years after the war were chaotic including mail deliveries and after some years a new organization called the International Correspondence Chess Federation (ICCF) was founded. The first president of ICCF was J. L. Ormond from Switzerland. The first Finnish person in the administration of ICCF was Per-Erik Ekblom. He was elected as an auditor at the Krems Congress in 1967. Since then the longest Finnish career in the ICCF executive board was made by Ragnar Wikman.

The Finnish Central Chess Federation was a member of the International Correspondence Chess Federation. Authorized by it the leader of the correspondence chess section acted as the representative of ICCF in Finland. The first unofficial correspondence championship tournament in Finland was played during the war 1944–1946. The winner of the championship was Eino Heilimo.

In the 1950s it was decided to found a federation that specialized in correspondence chess in Finland. The first organization was founded on 6 January 1955 based on the ideas of government counselor Paavo Lihtonen. Eino Heilimo from Iisalmi was elected as the first chairman. However, the foundation fell through internal disagreements.

The present Finnish Correspondence Chess Federation (FCCF) was founded in 1961. Eino Heilimo was also the first chairman of the new federation. The chairmen of the Federation on following:

 1) Eino Heilimo 1961–1968
 2) Matti Uitto 1969–1973
 3) Raimo Lindroos 1974–1979 and 1984–6.5.1990
 4) Leo Lahdenmäki 1980–1983
 5) Esko Nuutilainen 6.5.1990–7.10.1990 (as vice chairman)
 6) Heikki Brusila 7.10.1990–31.12.1991 and 1.1.1994– 2009
 7) Erik Wahlberg 1992–1993
 8) Heikki Arppi 2010–present

The Finnish championship tournament has officially been run 61 times and unofficially, before the current organization, six times. The most successful player has been Bo Jäderholm from Turku. He has won five gold, two silver and one bronze medal.

World Championship Gold and Bronze 
Pertti Lehikoinen was the first Finn to win the Correspondence Chess World Championship. His moment of glory came in the XX World Championship Final, which took from 25.10.2004 to 20.2.2011. Incidentally, this was the longest Final and his successors from the 21st, 22nd and 23rd Finals are already known.

The first Finn to gain access to the World Championship Final was Risto Kauranen from Jyväskylä. He was fifth in the X tournament 1978–1984 and got the bronze medal in the XII tournament 1984–1991.

Asko Linna from Kokkola has also been successful in the World Championship Final. He was fourth in the XVII tournament 2002–2007, only half a point from the winner.

The Golden 1980s
The Finnish correspondence chess had its golden era in the 1980s. In the biggest national tournament, in memoriam Usko Koskinen, as many as 264 players participated. The year was 1984. In 1980 the Finnish Correspondence Chess Federation had 1200 members. In 1974 altogether 1001 players participated in different tournaments and the total number of games played was 3397. Even in the 1990s there was a big tournament, when in the friendly match between Sweden and Finland there were 579 tables. That number is the world record.

Twice in the Olympic Final
The Finnish national team has reached the Olympic Final twice. In the X Olympic Final (1987–95) Finland was 9th. In the Finnish team there played Juhani Sorri, Pentti Palmo, Olli Koskinen, Timothy Binham, Ilkka Kanko and Torvald Perman.

The second time, when Finland is in the Olympic Final, is year 2010. This is one of the last postal Olympic Finals. The Finnish team is composed of Tero Kokkila, Ilkka Salmi, Pertti Raivio and again Pentti Palmo.

Ladies World Championship Final
A Finn has participated in the Ladies World Championship once, when Aulikki Ristoja-Lehtimäki placed 11th in the VI final tournament in the 1990s.

European Championship Finals
In the personal European Championship finals Finland has achieved one silver (Risto Kauranen) and four bronze medals (Risto Kauranen, Pentti Palmo, Lauri Lempiäinen and Toivo Saarenpää).

World Champion

 Lehikoinen, Pertti FIN GM 2011

Grandmasters

 Siikaluoma, Auno FIN GM 2012
 Pigg, Heikki FIN GM 2007
 Linna, Asko FIN GM 2006
 Hiltunen, Reijo FIN GM 1999
 Tikkanen, Kari FIN GM 1999
 Kivimäki, Jaakko FIN GM 1998
 Kokkila, Tero FIN GM 1996
 Österman, Georg FIN GM 1994
 Kujala, Auvo FIN GM 1991
 Lehikoinen, Pertti FIN GM 1985
 Koskinen, Olli FIN GM 1982
 Sorri, Juhani FIN GM 1982
 Palmo, Pentti FIN GM 1980
 Kauranen, Risto FIN GM 1977

Senior International Masters

 Ylönen, Olli FIN SIM 2014
 Koskela, Taisto FIN SIM 2012
 Salmi, Ilkka FIN SIM 2010
 Siikaluoma, Auno FIN SIM 2010
 Peuraniemi, Pertti FIN SIM 2009
 Mannermaa, Jari FIN SIM 2007
 Arppi, Heikki FIN SIM 2006
 Fröberg, Harri FIN SIM 2003
 Harald, Olav FIN SIM 2003
 Neuvonen, Olavi FIN SIM 2003
 Parkkinen, Jyrki FIN SIM 2003
 Pigg, Heikki FIN SIM 2003
 Pukkila, Markku FIN SIM 2003
 Jäderholm, Bo FIN SIM 2002
 Oikamo, Teijo FIN SIM 2002
 Hesse, Günter FIN SIM 2001
 Backlund, Åke FIN SIM 1999
 Binham, Timothy FIN SIM 1999
 Ebeling, Mika FIN SIM 1999

International Masters

 Ylönen, Olli FIN IM 2013
 Muukkonen, Kimmo FIN IM 2011
 Kauppinen, Martti FIN IM 2011
 Laine, Panu FIN IM 2011
 Siikaluoma, Auno FIN IM 2010
 Salmi, Ilkka FIN IM 2009
 Kolehmainen, Kari FIN IM 2004
 Koskela, Taisto FIN IM 2004
 Brusila, Heikki FIN IM 2003
 Halme, Olavi FIN IM 2003
 Huuskonen, Matti FIN IM 2003
 Ketola, Ville FIN IM 2003
 Sopanen, Pekka FIN IM 2003
 Juntunen, Reijo FIN IM 2002
 Karjalainen, Pekka FIN IM 2001
 Tuominen, Mauri FIN IM 2001
 Hietanen, Pauli FIN IM 2000
 Peuraniemi, Pertti FIN IM 1999
 Rissanen, Heikki FIN IM 1999
 Huuskonen, Veli-Matti FIN IM 1998
 Klemettinen, Pentti FIN IM 1998
 Mannermaa, Dr. Jari FIN IM 1998
 Söderberg, Kaj FIN IM 1998
 Välkesalmi, Kimmo FIN IM 1998
 Johansson, Clas-Erik FIN IM 1997
 Kauppala, Pekka FIN IM 1997
 Lehto, Arto FIN IM 1997
 Sutela, Raimo FIN IM 1997
 Pitkäranta, Tauno FIN IM 1996
 Raivio, Pertti FIN IM 1996
 Saarenpää, Toivo FIN IM 1996
 Airas, Olavi FIN IM 1995
 Nyman, Karl FIN IM 1995
 Salokangas, Hannu FIN IM 1994
 Lempiäinen, Lauri FIN IM 1993
 Tolonen, Leo Toivovich FIN IM 1992
 Piuva, Matti FIN IM 1990
 Räty, Sakari FIN IM 1990
 Wikman, Ragnar FIN IM 1987
 Kanko, Ilkka FIN IM 1984
 Hintikka, Eero FIN IM 1983
 Kaunonen, Kalevi FIN IM 1983
 Ojanen, Kaarle FIN IM 1981
 Lågland, Göran FIN IM 1975
 Venäläinen, Unto FIN IM 1973

Lady International Master

 Ristoja-Lehtimäki, Mrs. Aulikki FIN LIM 1998

International Arbiters

 Johansson, Clas-Erik FIN IA 1997
 Halme, Olavi FIN IA 1991
 Lahdenmäki, Leo FIN IA 1989
 Brusila, Heikki FIN IA 1982
 Jantunen, Olli FIN IA 1980
 Nuutilainen, Esko FIN IA 1975
 Wikman, Ragnar FIN IA 1975
 Harju, Antero FIN IA 1974
 Lindroos, Raimo FIN IA 1971

References 
ICCF, Grandmasters
ICCF, Senior International Masters
ICCF, International Masters
ICCF, Lady Grandmasters
ICCF, Lady International Masters
ICCF, International Arbiter

Notes

External links
International Correspondence Chess Federation web site
International Correspondence Chess Federation
ICCF national member federations
Finnish Correspondence Chess Federation (FCCF) web site

Chess organizations
Regional ICCF organizations
Correspondence Chess Federation
Correspondence Chess Federation